Cinereomyces is a genus of resupinate (crust-like) fungi in the family Gelatoporiaceae. The genus was circumscribed by Swiss mycologist Walter Jülich in 1981. Species in the genus have a gray pore surface except for a whitish margin, and skeletal hyphae with gelatinized walls. , Index Fungorum accepts two species of Cinereomyces: the type, C. lindbladii, and C. dilutabilis. The latter species was transferred to Cinereomyces from Diplomitoporus in 2016.

Distribution
Cinereomyces lindbladii is widely distributed, while C. dilutabilis has been recorded from Brazil and Costa Rica.

References

External links

Gelatoporiaceae
Polyporales genera
Fungi described in 1982
Taxa named by Walter Jülich